Arthur Agatston (born January 22, 1947) is an  American cardiologist and celebrity doctor best known as the developer of the South Beach Diet, but also as the author of many published scholarly papers in the field of noninvasive cardiac diagnostics. His scientific research led to the Agatston score for measuring coronary artery calcium.

Education 
Agatston earned an MD at New York University School of Medicine in 1973,  studied internal medicine at Montefiore Medical Center at the Albert Einstein College of Medicine and completed his cardiology fellowship at NYU.

Career 
Agatston started his medical career on staff at New York University Medical Center. After a year, he took a position at the Mount Sinai Medical Center & Miami Heart Institute in Miami Beach, Florida, where he later became director of the non-invasive cardiac lab.  He currently serves as the medical director, wellness & prevention at Baptist Health South Florida and practices at South Beach Preventive Cardiology.

References

External links
 WebMD biography
 Encyclopedia of World Biography
 South Beach Diet biography
 Time magazine interview
 PBS Frontline interview

Diet food advocates
Place of birth missing (living people)
New York University Grossman School of Medicine alumni
Living people
1947 births
American cardiologists